Countdown at Kusini (also known as Cool Red) is a 1976 American-Nigerian action/drama film written by Howard Friedlander and Ed Spielman, and directed by Ossie Davis.

Synopsis
During a trip to the newly independent nation of Fahari, Africa, Red Salter, an African American jazz musician, falls in love with Leah Matanzima, but she is involved in Fahari's struggle against a puppet government run by multinational corporations. Jealous of Leah's friendship with white British journalist Charles Henderson, Red reluctantly joins her support of revolutionary leader Ernest Motapo and helps her obtain guns from weapons dealer Saidu. When Fahari officials arrest them, Charles rescues Leah and Red; then spirits them away in a motorboat, but Ben Amed, a French mercenary hired to assassinate Motapo, rams them with another boat and kills Charles. Marnie (Yola), Motapo's traitorous nephew, arranges with Amed to ambush Motapo at a railroad junction near Kusini, but Leah and Red arrive in time with revolutionary fighters. After killing Marnie and Amed, Leah welcomes Red to Africa's revolution against European imperialism.

Cast
Ruby Dee - Leah Matanzima 
Ossie Davis - Ernest Motapo
Greg Morris - Red Salter
Tom Aldredge - Ben Amed 
Michael Ebert - Charles Henderson
Thomas Baptiste - John Okello
Jab Adu - Juma Bakari 
Elsie Olusola - Mamouda 
Funsho Adeolu - Marni
Ibidun Allison - Sniper

Production
The film was conceived and entirely financed by Delta Sigma Theta, an African-American sorority that owned DST Telecommunications which produced material to counter the "inaccurate portrayal of black people in media."

Filming took place in August 1974 in Lagos, Nigeria with both U.S. and Nigerian crews.

Dee, Davis and Morris deferred their salaries until the film made a profit.

References

External links

1976 films
American action drama films
1970s action drama films
1970s war drama films
Films directed by Ossie Davis
Films set in Africa
Films shot in Lagos
Nigerian action drama films
American films about revenge
Films about revenge
1976 drama films
1970s English-language films
English-language Nigerian films
1970s American films